Robert "Rob" Lazeo (born March 23, 1973 in Abbotsford, British Columbia) is a retired professional Canadian football offensive lineman who spent 14 seasons playing in the Canadian Football League. He spent the last four years of his career with the Calgary Stampeders where he won the 96th Grey Cup in the Stampeders' 2008 season. He also played for the Saskatchewan Roughriders and the Winnipeg Blue Bombers.

References 

1973 births
Living people
Calgary Stampeders players
Canadian football offensive linemen
Sportspeople from Abbotsford, British Columbia
Players of Canadian football from British Columbia
Saskatchewan Roughriders players
Western Illinois Leathernecks football players
Winnipeg Blue Bombers players